KF Saraj (FK Saraj) is a football club based in Saraj Municipality, North Macedonia. They are currently competing in the OFS Skopje league.

History 
The club was founded in 2011. It was a very successful team with many youngsters, who were hungry for success. They started playing in the Fourth Macedonian Football League and 1 year later they got promoted to the Third Macedonian League. But since 2013 KF Saraj is not existing, only the Youth Academy is active now.

References

External links 
Club info at MacedonianFootball 
Football Federation of Macedonia 

Football clubs in Skopje
Association football clubs established in 2011
2011 establishments in the Republic of Macedonia
Albanian football clubs in North Macedonia